Mowgli is a fictional feral boy in some stories written by Rudyard Kipling.

Mowgli may also refer to:

 Mowgli: Legend of the Jungle, a 2018 film version of The Jungle Book
 Mowgli: The New Adventures of the Jungle Book, a television series based on the Kipling stories
 "Mowgli's Brothers", a short story later included as the first chapter of The Jungle Book
 Mowgli's Brothers (TV special), an animated television special based on the story
 All the Mowgli Stories, a collection of short stories about Mowgli
 Adventures of Mowgli, a Russian animated feature-length story
 The Mowgli's, a rock band
 "Mowgli's Road", a song by Marina and the Diamonds
Camp Mowglis, a summer camp
 Mowgli syndrome
 SITAR GY-90 Mowgli, a French light aircraft